Palacio (palace) is a Spanish habitational name. It may have originated from many places in Spain, especially in Galicia and Asturies. Notable people with the surname include:

Agustina Palacio de Libarona (1825-1880), Argentine writer, storyteller, heroine
Alberto Palacio, engineer
Alfredo Palacio, former president of Ecuador
Andy Palacio, Belizean musician
Emilio Palacio, Ecuadorian journalist
Ernesto Palacio, opera singer
Héctor Palacio, Colombian road racing cyclist
Milt Palacio, basketball player
Rodrigo Palacio, footballer
R. J. Palacio, American writer of the 2012 children's novel Wonder

See also
 Palacios (disambiguation)

References 

Surnames of Spanish origin